Michael Latham Powell (30 September 1905 – 19 February 1990) was an English filmmaker, celebrated for his partnership with Emeric Pressburger. Through their production company The Archers, they together wrote, produced and directed a series of classic British films, notably The Life and Death of Colonel Blimp (1943), A Canterbury Tale (1944), I Know Where I'm Going! (1945), A Matter of Life and Death (1946, also called Stairway to Heaven), Black Narcissus (1947), The Red Shoes (1948), and The Tales of Hoffmann (1951). His controversial 1960 film Peeping Tom, today considered a classic, and a contender as the first "slasher", was so vilified on first release that his career was seriously damaged.

Many filmmakers such as Martin Scorsese, Francis Ford Coppola and George A. Romero have cited Powell as an influence. In 1981, he received the BAFTA Academy Fellowship Award along with his partner Pressburger, the highest honour the British Film Academy can give a filmmaker. He has been played on screen by Alastair Thomson Mills in the award-winning short film Òran na h-Eala (2022) which explores Moira Shearer's life-changing decision to appear in The Red Shoes.

Early life
Powell was the second son and youngest child of Thomas William Powell, a hop farmer, and Mabel, daughter of Frederick Corbett, of Worcester, England. Powell was born in Bekesbourne, Kent, and educated at The King's School, Canterbury and then at Dulwich College. He started work at the National Provincial Bank in 1922 but quickly realised he was not cut out to be a banker.

Film career
Powell entered the film industry in 1925 through working with director Rex Ingram at the Victorine Studios in Nice, France (the contact with Ingram was made through Powell's father, who owned a hotel in Nice). He first started out as a general studio hand, the proverbial "gofer": sweeping the floor, making coffee, fetching and carrying. Soon he progressed to other work such as stills photography, writing titles (for the silent films) and many other jobs including a few acting roles, usually as comic characters. Powell made his film début as a "comic English tourist" in The Magician (1926).

Returning to England in 1928, Powell worked at a diverse series of jobs for various filmmakers including as a stills photographer on Alfred Hitchcock's silent film Champagne (1928). He also signed on in a similar role on Hitchcock's first "talkie", Blackmail (1929). In his autobiography, Powell claims he suggested the ending in the British Museum which was the first of Hitchcock's "monumental" climaxes to his films. Powell and Hitchcock remained friends for the remainder of Hitchcock's life.

After scriptwriting on two productions, Powell entered into a partnership with American producer Jerry Jackson in 1931 to make "quota quickies", hour-long films needed to satisfy a legal requirement that British cinemas screen a certain quota of British films. During this period, he developed his directing skills, sometimes making up to seven films a year.

Although he had taken on some directing responsibilities in other films, Powell had his first screen credit as a director on Two Crowded Hours (1931). This thriller was considered a modest success at the box office despite its limited budget. From 1931 to 1936, Powell was the director of 23 films, including the critically received  Red Ensign (1934) and The Phantom Light (1935).

In 1937 Powell completed his first truly personal project, The Edge of the World. Powell gathered together a cast and crew who were willing to take part in an expedition to what was then a very isolated part of the UK. They had to stay there for quite a few months and finished up with a film which not only told the story he wanted but also captured the raw natural beauty of the location.

By 1939, Powell had been hired as a contract director by Alexander Korda on the strength of The Edge of the World. Korda set him to work on some projects such as Burmese Silver that were subsequently cancelled. Nonetheless, Powell was brought in to save a film that was being made as a vehicle for two of Korda's star players, Conrad Veidt and Valerie Hobson. The film was The Spy in Black, where Powell first met Emeric Pressburger in 1939.

Meeting Emeric Pressburger
The original script of The Spy in Black followed the book quite closely, but was too verbose and did not have a good role for either Veidt or Hobson. Korda called a meeting where he introduced a diminutive man, saying, "Well now, I have asked Emeric to read the script, and he has things to say to us."

Powell then went on to record (in A Life in Movies) how:
"Emeric produced a very small piece of rolled-up paper, and addressed the meeting. I listened spellbound. Since talkies took over the movies, I had worked with some good writers, but I had never met anything like this. In the silent days, the top [American] screenwriters were technicians rather than dramatists ... the European cinema remained highly literate and each country, conscious of its separate culture and literature, strove to outdo the other. All this was changed by the talkies. America, with its enormous wealth and enthusiasm and it technical resources, waved the big stick. ... The European film no longer existed. ... Only the great German film business was prepared to fight the American monopoly, and Dr. Goebbels soon put a stop to that in 1933. But the day that Emeric walked out of his flat, leaving the key in the door to save the storm-troopers the trouble of breaking it down, was the worst day's work that the clever doctor ever did for his country's reputation, as he was soon to find out.

As I said, I listened spellbound to this small Hungarian wizard, as Emeric unfolded his notes, until they were at least six inches long. He had stood Storer Clouston's plot on its head and completely restructured the film."

They both soon recognised that although they were total opposites in background and personality, they had a common attitude to film-making and that they could work very well together. After making two more films together, Contraband (1940) and 49th Parallel (1941), with separate credits, the pair decided to form a partnership and to sign their films jointly as "Written, Produced and Directed by Michael Powell and Emeric Pressburger."

The Archers
Working together as co-producers, writers and directors in a partnership they dubbed "The Archers", they made 19 feature films, many of which received critical and commercial success. Their best films are still regarded as classics of 20th century British cinema.  The BFI 100 list of "the favourite British films of the 20th century" contains five of Powell's films, four with Pressburger.

Although admirers would argue that Powell ought to rank alongside fellow British directors Alfred Hitchcock and David Lean, his career suffered a severe reversal after the release of the controversial psychological thriller film Peeping Tom, made in 1960 as a solo effort. The film was excoriated by mainstream British critics, who were offended by its sexual and violent images; Powell was ostracized by the film industry and found it almost impossible to work thereafter.

The film did, however, meet with the rapturous approval of the young critics of Positif and Midi-Minuit Fantastique in France, and those of Motion in England, and in 1965 he was subject of a major positive revaluation by Raymond Durgnat in the auteurist magazine Movie, later included in Durgnat's influential book A Mirror for England.

Powell's films came to have a cult reputation, broadened during the 1970s and early 1980s by a series of retrospectives and rediscoveries, as well as further articles and books. By the time of his death, he and Pressburger were recognised as one of the foremost film partnerships of all time – and cited as a key influence by many noted filmmakers such as Martin Scorsese, Brian De Palma, and Francis Ford Coppola.

Personal life
In 1927 Powell married Gloria Mary Rouger, an American dancer; they were married in France and stayed together for only three weeks. During the 1940s, Powell had love affairs with actresses Deborah Kerr and Kathleen Byron. From 1 July 1943 until her death on 5 July 1983, Powell was married to Frances "Frankie" May Reidy, the daughter of medical practitioner Jerome Reidy; they had two sons: Kevin Michael Powell (b. 1945) and Columba Jerome Reidy Powell (b. 1951). He also lived with actress Pamela Brown for many years until her death from cancer in 1975.

Subsequently, Powell was married to film editor Thelma Schoonmaker from 19 May 1984 until his own death from cancer at his home in Avening, Gloucestershire. His niece was the Australian actress Cornelia Frances, who appeared in bit parts in her uncle's early films.

Preservation
The Academy Film Archive has preserved A Matter of Life and Death and The Life and Death of Colonel Blimp by Michael Powell and Emeric Pressburger.

Awards, nominations and honours
 1943: Oscar nominated for 49th Parallel as Best Picture
 1943: Oscar nominated for One of Our Aircraft Is Missing for Best Writing, Original Screenplay. Shared with Emeric Pressburger
 1948: Won Danish Bodil Award for A Matter of Life and Death as Best European Film. Shared with Emeric Pressburger
 1948  Nominated for The Red Shoes for Venice Film Festival Golden Lion.  Shared with Emeric Pressburger
 1949: Oscar nominated for The Red Shoes as Best Picture. Shared with Emeric Pressburger
 1951: Cannes Film Festival nominated for The Tales of Hoffmann for Grand Prize of the Festival.  Shared with Emeric Pressburger
 1951: Won Silver Bear from 1st Berlin International Film Festival for The Tales of Hoffmann as Best Musical. Shared with Emeric Pressburger
 1957: BAFTA Award nominated for The Battle of the River Plate as Best British Screenplay. Shared with Emeric Pressburger.
 1959: Cannes Film Festival won the Technical Grand Prize for Luna de Miel. Nominated for Golden Palm. 
 1978: Awarded Hon DLitt, University of East Anglia
 1978: Awarded Hon DLitt, University of Kent
 1981: Made fellow of BAFTA
 1982: Awarded Career Gold Lion from the Venice Film Festival
 1983: Made fellow of the British Film Institute (BFI)
 1987: Awarded Hon Doctorate, Royal College of Art
 1987: Awarded Akira Kurosawa Award from San Francisco International Film Festival
 2014: An English Heritage Blue plaque to commemorate Michael Powell and Emeric Pressburger was unveiled on 17 February 2014 by Martin Scorsese and Thelma Schoonmaker at Dorset House, Gloucester Place, London NW1 5AG where The Archers had their offices from 1942 - 47.

Legacy
 Cited as a major influence on many film-makers such as Martin Scorsese, Francis Ford Coppola, George A. Romero and Bertrand Tavernier.  Said Thelma Schoonmaker (Scorsese's long-time film editor and Powell's third wife) of Scorsese, "Anyone he meets, or the actors he works with, he immediately starts bombarding with Powell and Pressburger movies." Scorsese and Schoonmaker are working on restoring Powell's films, beginning with The Red Shoes and The Life and Death of Colonel Blimp.
 The Michael Powell Award for the Best New British Feature was instigated in 1993 at the Edinburgh International Film Festival and is sponsored by the UK Film Council and is "named in homage to one of Britain's most original filmmakers".
 Pinewood Studios, where Powell made many of his most notable films, has named a mixing theatre in the post-production department after him: The Powell Theatre. A giant picture of the director covers the door to the theatre, where many well-known films are mixed.
 The Film, Radio and Television Department of Canterbury Christ Church University has its main building named after him: The Powell Building.
  He has been played on screen by Alastair Thomson Mills in the award-winning short film  (2022) which explores Moira Shearer's life changing decision to appear in The Red Shoes.

Filmography

Other works

Books by Michael Powell
 1938: 200,000 Feet on Foula. London: Faber & Faber. (The story of the making of The Edge of the World was also reprinted as  200,000 Feet – The Edge of the World in the United States.)
 1956: Graf Spee. London: Hodder & Stoughton. (This book contains much information that Powell and Pressburger could not include in their film The Battle of the River Plate.)
 1957: Death in the South Atlantic: The Last Voyage of the Graf Spee. New York: Rinehart. (American edition of Graf Spee)
 1975: A Waiting Game. London: Joseph. .
 1976: The Last Voyage of the Graf Spee. London: White Lion Publishers. . (Second British edition of Graf Spee)
 1978: (with Emeric Pressburger) The Red Shoes. London: Avon Books. .
 1986: A Life In Movies: An  Autobiography. London: Heinemann. .
 1990: Edge of the World. London: Faber & Faber. . (This book is a paperback edition of 200,000 feet on Foula.)
 1992: Million Dollar Movie London: Heinemann. . (This is the second part of Powell's autobiography.)
 1994: (with Emeric Pressburger and Ian Christie) The Life and Death of Colonel Blimp. London: Faber & Faber. . (This book includes memos from Churchill and notes showing how the script developed.)

Many of these titles were also published in other countries or republished. The list above deals with initial publications except where the name was changed in a subsequent edition or printing.

Theatre

 1944: Directed Ernest Hemingway's The Fifth Column at the Theatre Royal, Glasgow
 1944: Directed Jan de Hartog's Skipper Next To God at the Theatre Royal, Windsor
 1951: Directed James Forsyth's Heloise at the Golders Green Hippodrome, London

References
Notes

Citations

Bibliography

 Christie, Ian. Arrows of Desire: The Films of Michael Powell and Emeric Pressburger.  London: Waterstone, 1994. ; First edition 1985. .
 Christie, Ian. Powell, Pressburger and Others.  London: British Film Institute, 1978. .
 Christie, Ian and Andrew Moor, eds. The Cinema of Michael Powell: International Perspectives on an English Filmmaker. London: BFI, 2005. .
 Darakhvelidze, George. Landscapes of Dreams: The Cinema of Michael Powell and Emeric Pressburger (Part 1-7) (in Russian). Vinnitsa, Ukraine: Globe Press, 2008-2019. .
 Esteve, Llorenç. Michael Powell y Emeric Pressburger (in Spanish).  Rio de Janeiro, Brazil: Catedra, 2002.  .
 Howard, James. Michael Powell. London: BT Batsford Ltd, 1996. .
 Lazar, David, ed. Michael Powell: Interviews. Jackson, Mississippi: University Press of Mississippi, 2003. .
 Macdonald, Kevin. Emeric Pressburger: The Life and Death of a Screenwriter. London: Faber & Faber, 1994. 
 Moor, Andrew. Powell and Pressburger: A Cinema of Magic Spaces. London: I.B. Tauris, 2005. .
 Powell, Michael. A Life in Movies (autobiography). London: Heinemann, 1993. ; First edition 1986. .
 Powell, Michael. Million Dollar Movie (The second volume of his autobiography). London: Heinemann, 1992. , later edition, 2000.  (pbk).
 Thiéry, Natacha. Photogénie du désir: Michael Powell et Emeric Pressburger 1945–1950 (in French). Rennes, France: Presse Universitaires de Rennes, 2009. .
 Howard, James. 'I Live Cinema' : The Life and Films of Michael Powell. UK: CreateSpace Independent Publishing Platform, June 2013.

External links

 BFI Filmography
 
 
 NFT interviews (audio clips)
 Best British Directors on FutureMovies.co.uk
 Michael Powell biography on BritMovie.co.uk
 Michael Powell at the Powell & Pressburger Pages
 Articles about :
 early work
 sense of landscape
 work with Pressburger
 classic Powell & Pressburger
 the war years
 later years
 Essay, Filmography, Bibliography, Links at Senses of Cinema
 Michael Powell discusses his autobiography A Life in Movies on The Leonard Lopate Show
 Michael Powell discusses his autobiography A Life in Movies – a British Library sound recording

1905 births
1990 deaths
BAFTA fellows
Deaths from cancer in England
English film directors
English film producers
British film production company founders
English-language film directors
English male screenwriters
People educated at The King's School, Canterbury
People educated at Dulwich College
People from Bekesbourne
People from Avening
20th-century English screenwriters
20th-century English male writers
20th-century English businesspeople